Magg is a surname of German origin. Notable people with the surname include:

Alphons Magg (1891–1967), Swiss sculptor
Alois Magg (1914–2001), German air force captain
Fritz Magg (1914–1997), Austrian-American cellist
Julius Magg (1884–1931), Austrian engineer and professor

See also
Movie Magg, 1955 song by Carl Perkins
Chief Steward Magg, fictional character in the high fantasy novel series The Chronicles of Prydain
Maggs

Surnames of German origin